Bersted is a civil parish in the Arun district of West Sussex, England. It is made up of two somewhat independent villages, North Bersted and Shripney which contribute to some common amenities.

Governance
An electoral ward in the same name exists. This ward contains a little of Bognor Regis but still has a total population taken at the 2011 census of 8,496.

Geography
Elevations range from 8m in the south-west to 2-3m above ordnance datum in the south-east where a straightened river drains the parish.

An industrial and business estate takes up the easternmost part of Bersted - in common with most of the country business tends to refer to their post town Bognor Regis and includes a superstore.  Some of this area is in the town's boundaries.

History

At North Bersted were found Celtic and Roman settlement remains, including the grave of a warrior known as the North Bersted Man.
The ancient village of South Bersted is now part of Bognor Regis civil parish; it has the 13th century church of the Bersted ecclesiastical parish, which is mid-ranked in the national system.

Localities

North Bersted 

Shripney
Shripney, in the northeast, has evolved from a thirteenth-century hamlet. The Robin Hood pub is on Shripney Road. In Shripney Lane, there are over forty dwellings, including thatched cottages and caravans. The most recent change to Shripney Lane was when modern houses were built in 2004.

References

Arun District